Segun Moses Toriola (born 18 September 1974 in Ilorin, Kwara, Nigeria) is a retired Nigeria professional table tennis player.

He is the youngest of nine brothers.

Since 1995 he has been ranked as the best Nigerian player. He has been amongst the top table tennis players in Africa since the mid-1990s. Ranked number 1 in Africa from 1998 to June 2008, when Egyptian Eli Saleh Ahmed became the leading African table tennis player. However, since 2009, Toriola has again been the number 1 in Africa. Renowned for his unusual style of forehand play, which makes him an awkward opponent for many. Despite lacking good footwork has an excellent topspin, which has allowed him to pull off many upsets with top world players.

During his career he has won multiple medals in international singles tournaments. Some of his important achievements are:
 4 African Table Tennis Singles Championships (1998, 2002, 2004, 2006) and 2 Doubles Championships (1994,1992)
 A Commonwealth Singles Championship (2002) in Manchester (United Kingdom)
 A Commonwealth Doubles Championship and Singles Bronze Medal (2006) in Melbourne (Australia)
 4 All-Africa Games Singles Gold Medals (1995, 1999, 2003, 2007), 4 Doubles Gold Medals (1995, 1999, 2003, 2007), 1 Mixed Doubles Gold Medal (1999, with Bose Kaffo; they also won silver in 2003) and 3 Team Gold Medals (1995, 1999, 2003).

He represented Nigeria at seven Summer Olympics debuting at Barcelona. His biggest achievement at the Olympics has been reaching the Men's Singles 1/16 final at the 2008 Summer Olympics in Beijing, beating amongst others former world number 1 Jean-Michel Saive as well as David Zhuang. His 1/32 match-up with Jean-Michel Saive was seen by many as one of the highlights of the Men's Singles Tournament. He narrowly lost 4–3 to heavily favoured Oh Sang-Eun in the 1/16 final.

His fifth Olympic appearance in 2008 made him the first Nigerian man to appear at five Olympics. This feat was achieved four years earlier by sprinter Mary Onyali and also in 2008 by fellow table tennis player Bose Kaffo. By the end of the 2008 Summer Olympics, only thirteen table tennis players worldwide had appeared at least five Olympics. With his participation in 2012 Olympics in London he became the only Nigerian athlete to appear at six Olympics. He therefore joined João N'Tyamba of Angola and Maria Mutola of Mozambique as only third ever African athlete to compete in so many Summer Olympics.

2018 ITTF African-Cup

Toriola competed in the 2018 IITF African-Cup, placing first in group 4, allowing him to qualify for the Quarter Finals. In the Quarter Finals, Toriola faced and was defeated by Congolese player Saheed Idowu (2-4) resulting in Toriola's elimination. In the placement rounds, Toriola defeated both Thameur Mamia (3-2) and Sami Kheroff (3-1) to finish the tournament at 5th place.

Legacy

Segun Toriola's name is synonymous with Nigerian and African Table Tennis. Having won numerous African titles and appearing in six Olympic games, Toriola has been influential well into his 40s as he has been consistently placed among Africa's top ten. His teaming with fellow powerhouse Quadri Aruna in Men's Doubles and Team events to represent their home country of Nigeria has become common on the world stage.

See also
 List of table tennis players
 List of athletes with the most appearances at Olympic Games

References

External links

1974 births
Living people
Nigerian male table tennis players
Olympic table tennis players of Nigeria
Table tennis players at the 1992 Summer Olympics
Table tennis players at the 1996 Summer Olympics
Table tennis players at the 2000 Summer Olympics
Table tennis players at the 2004 Summer Olympics
Table tennis players at the 2008 Summer Olympics
Table tennis players at the 2012 Summer Olympics
Table tennis players at the 2016 Summer Olympics
Commonwealth Games gold medallists for Nigeria
Commonwealth Games bronze medallists for Nigeria
Table tennis players at the 2006 Commonwealth Games
Table tennis players at the 2014 Commonwealth Games
Commonwealth Games medallists in table tennis
African Games gold medalists for Nigeria
African Games medalists in table tennis
African Games silver medalists for Nigeria
African Games bronze medalists for Nigeria
Competitors at the 1995 All-Africa Games
Competitors at the 1999 All-Africa Games
Competitors at the 2003 All-Africa Games
Competitors at the 2007 All-Africa Games
Competitors at the 2011 All-Africa Games
Competitors at the 2019 African Games
People from Ilorin
20th-century Nigerian people
21st-century Nigerian people
Medallists at the 2002 Commonwealth Games
Medallists at the 2006 Commonwealth Games